Mark A. Brown (born February 10, 1961) is an American gaming industry executive known for serving as CEO of Trump Hotels and Casinos Inc. and president of The Venetian Macau, Sands Macau, and The Four Seasons Macau.  In November 2010, Brown joined Wynn Resorts, Ltd in advance of the organization's multibillion-dollar Cotai Strip Macau project. In November 2014 Brown was named president and CEO of Imperial Pacific Ltd's $7.1 Billion casino resort project in Saipan.

Biography
Mark Anthony Brown was raised in Brigantine, New Jersey and entered the gaming industry in the late 1970s at Atlantic City's Resorts International.  By age 25, Brown was married with two sons and was quickly rising through industry ranks.  After a long tenure as CEO of Trump Hotels, in 2005 Brown exercised a clause in his contract that allowed him to leave with a golden parachute if Donald Trump ever owned less than 35% of the company.  He then moved to Macau (SAR of PRC) to lead the largest project in gaming industry history with the Sands Corporation.  Brown served as CEO for Imperial Pacific gaming project in the United States territory of Saipan, with an exclusive gaming license and project scope of US$7.1 Billion.  The initial phase of the project has broken US records for casino volume, with US$3.95 Billion in VIP gaming turnover during the month of September 2016. He retired in early January 2018.

Management style
In top industry circles, Brown is known for his ability to dominate through forthright and efficient communication.  Employees have been quoted referring to Brown as “a tremendous communicator."    
“I rely on a few key people to keep me informed. They know I trust them… when I need to know something… I know I can call up Mark Brown…” said Donald Trump.

Some feel Brown's greatest asset is his ability to relate to all forms of people.  Despite an intimidating presence, Brown is friendly and down to earth, known for treating all employees equally.
  Brown has been quoted many times saying ‘We can all throw our employee name tags into the ocean’, expressing his deep belief that all employees are of equal importance and should all be treated with the utmost respect.

Non-profit work
Brown served as chairman of the Atlantic City Convention Authority, president of the Atlantic City Casino Association, and on the board of directors for several other non-profit organizations such as N.J. D.A.R.E, Covenant House, and United Way.  Brown set the all-time fundraising record at United Way.  For his efforts, Brown has received such awards as the Businessman of the Year Award from the Atlantic City Chamber of Commerce, the Humanitarian of the Year Award from the Trocki Hebrew Academy, and the D.A.R.E. Future of New Jersey Award.  In the summer of 2008, Brown ran with the Olympic Torch during the torch relays.

References

External links

 BLOOMBERG NEWS November 14, 2016 

 BusinessWeek profile

1961 births
Living people
People from Brigantine, New Jersey
American casino industry businesspeople